Marguerite is an unincorporated community and coal town in Westmoreland County, Pennsylvania, United States. It was also known as Klondike.

According to a 1994 study by the U.S. Department of the Interior, Marguerite was established in 1897, when The Standard Connellsville Coke Company began developing a coal mine and coke works nearby and built houses for the  employees.  A second mine followed in 1900. The H.C. Frick Coke Company took over operations in 1903  and built more houses. At one point nearly 1,000 people reportedly lived in the area. Mining and coking ceased in Marguerite in the 1940s. The 1994 study found some traces of prior industrial activity, primarily disused coke ovens.

References

Unincorporated communities in Westmoreland County, Pennsylvania
Coal towns in Pennsylvania
Unincorporated communities in Pennsylvania